Ornithogalum saundersiae, or giant chincherinchee, is a species of Ornithogalum (star of Bethlehem) in the  subfamily Scilloideae of family Asparagaceae.

Description  
Ornithogalum saundersiae is a perennial, herbaceous bulbous plant. It reaches 30 to 100 cm. in height. The leaves measure 60 x 5 cm. and are less than half as long as the flower stem. The upper leaf surface is a shiny dark green. The inflorescence consists of numerous flowers and is conical. The flower stems are long. The tepals are white, 10 to 15 millimeters long. The ovary is a very dark green. The plant flowers from June to August.

Distribution and habitat  
Ornithogalum saundersiae is found in South Africa in the Eastern Transvaal, Natal, and Eswatini. It grows best on rocky glades.

Uses  
Sold as bulbs for ornamental garden flowers and as cut flowers.

Bibliography 

 Eckehardt J. Jäger, Friedrich Ebel, Peter Hanelt, Gerd K. Müller (eds.): Rothmaler Exkursionsflora von Deutschland. Band 5: Krautige Zier- und Nutzpflanzen. Spektrum Akademischer Verlag, Berlin Heidelberg 2008, .
 Gard. Chron. ser. 3, 16:452.  1894
 
 Global plants

References

External links 
 Brent and Becky's Bulbs
 SF Gate: How to grow
 Dave's Garden

saundersiae
Taxa named by John Gilbert Baker